Termitomyces titanicus (common name chi-ngulu-ngulu) is a species of fungus in the Lyophyllaceae family. Found in West Africa (as well as Zambia and the Katanga Province of DR Congo), it has a
cap that may reach 1 metre (3 ft) in diameter on a stipe up to 22 inches (57 cm) in length.  Termitomyces is symbiotic with termites of the genus Macrotermes who raise the hyphae upon partially digested leaves as their primary foodstuff. T. titanicus was unknown to Western science prior to 1980, even though it was a common item in the native markets.  Pegler and Piearce made no attempt to explain its late discovery.

References

Lyophyllaceae
Edible fungi
Fungi of Africa
Fungi described in 1980